Watai (written: 渡井) is a Japanese surname. Notable people with the surname include:

, Japanese footballer
, Japanese chess player

Japanese-language surnames